Zygmunt Pieda (born 23 April 1933 in Szopienice, Poland) is a Polish former footballer.

Playing career

Poland
Pieda played for Ruch Chorzów and Legia Warsaw in a twelve-year career in the Polish Ekstraklasa, captaining Legia to a cup and league double in 1955.

Australia
In 1966 he was lured along with countrymen Paweł Sobek, Henryk Lukoszek and Władysław Musiał to Australia to play for struggling Perth team Cracovia. After one season the team won the State League.

Honours

Individual
D'Orsogna Cup Man of the Match: 1967
Football Hall of Fame Western Australia Hall of Champions Inducted: 2002
Football Hall of Fame Western Australia Century of Champions, The 1960s

Club
Legia Warsaw
Ekstraklasa Winner: 1955
Polish Cup Winner: 1955
Cracovia
Western Australia State League: 1966
D'Orsogna Cup Winner: 1967
Night Series Winner: 1967

References

Polish footballers
Polish emigrants to Australia
Ekstraklasa players
Legia Warsaw players
Ruch Chorzów players
1933 births
Living people
Sportspeople from Katowice
Association football forwards